Masanada Hoovu is a 1985 Indian Kannada language film directed by Puttanna Kanagal, based on T. R. Subba Rao's novel of the same name. It stars Jayanthi, Ambareesh, Hema Choudhary and Aparna. It was Puttanna Kanagal's last as a director. His friend and long time associate, director K. S. L. Swamy, completed the film. Masanada Hoovu won multiple awards at the 1985-86 Karnataka State Film Awards including Best Actress (Jayanthi) and Best Supporting Actor.

Padma Vasanthi had originally been signed to play one of the roles and even learnt roller skating for the same. After his death, the same role was enacted by Vijayalakshmi Singh and a bicycle replaced the roller skates. Chandrika who would become a lead actress in the 90s has played a small role in the movie under her real name Sribharathi.

Cast
Jayanthi as Taradevi
Ambareesh as Singaru
Hema Choudhary as Amba
Aparna as Parvati
Lokanath
Mukhyamantri Chandru
Doddanna
Vijayalakshmi Singh as Shanta 
Sihi Kahi Geetha as Hema
Chandrika (credited as Sriharathi) as Saroja

Soundtrack

Awards
Karnataka State Film Awards 1985-86
Best Actress – Jayanthi
Best Supporting Actor – Ambareesh
Best Dialogue Writer – T. G. Ashwatha Narayana
Best Cinematographer – S. Maruthi Rao
Best Sound Recording – C. D. Vishwanath
Special Award (Art Director) – Arun D. Godgaonkar

References

External links

1980s Kannada-language films
Films based on Indian novels
Films directed by Puttanna Kanagal
Films scored by Vijaya Bhaskar